Trans-Mississippi was a common name of the geographic area west of the Mississippi River during the 19th century.  The area included Arkansas, Louisiana, Missouri, Texas, Indian Territory (now Oklahoma), and many other territories.

The term "Trans-Mississippi" was historically used to refer to any land "across the Mississippi" (or the entire western two-thirds of the United States).  In 1898, a Trans-Mississippi Exposition was held at Kountze Park (Omaha, Nebraska).

Legacy
The postage stamps of the Trans-Mississippi Exposition Issue are considered some of the most beautiful stamps ever issued by the United States, and a complete set of the "Trans-Miss" is highly prized.  In 1998, a set of stamps using designs derived from the original issue was issued to commemorate its 100th anniversary.

See also
 Trans-Mississippi Department 
 Trans-Pecos
 Manifest Destiny 

Former regions and territories of the United States
History of Omaha, Nebraska
Mississippi River